The U.S. Department of Energy Office of Inspector General (DOE OIG) is an Inspector General office created by the Department of Energy Organization Act of 1977. The Inspector General for the Department of Energy is charged with investigating and auditing department programs to combat waste, fraud, and abuse.

History of Inspectors General

References 

Energy Office of Inspector General, Department of
United States Department of Energy
United States Department of Energy agencies